The Central Solomon languages are the four Papuan languages spoken in the state of Solomon Islands.

The four languages are, listed from northwest to southeast,
Bilua of Vella Lavella and Ghizo islands,
Touo (also known as Baniata) of Rendova Island,
Lavukaleve of the Russell Islands, and
Savosavo of Savo Island.

Classification
The four Central Solomon languages were identified as a family by Wilhelm Schmidt in 1908. The languages are at best distantly related, and evidence for their relationship is meager. Dunn and Terrill (2012) argue that the lexical evidence vanishes when Oceanic loanwords are excluded. Ross (2005) and Pedrós (2015), however, accept a connection, based on similarities among pronouns and other grammatical forms.

Pedrós (2015) suggests, tentatively, that the branching of the family is as follows.

Central Solomons
Lavukaleve–Touo
Savosavo–Bilua

Savosavo and Bilua, despite being the most distant languages geographically, both split more recently than Lavukaleve and Touo according to Pedrós.

Palmer (2018) regards the evidence for Central Solomons as tentative but promising.

An automated computational analysis (ASJP 4) by Müller et al. (2013) grouped Touo, Savosavo, and Bilua together. Lavukaleve was not included. However, since the analysis was automatically generated, the grouping could be either due to mutual lexical borrowing or genetic inheritance.

Pronoun reconstructions
Pedrós (2015) argues for the existence of the family through comparison of pronouns and other gender, person and number morphemes and based on the existence of a common syncretism between 2nd person nonsingular and inclusive. He performs an internal reconstruction for the pronominal morphemes of each language and then proposes a reconstruction of some of the pronouns of the claimed family. The reconstructions are the following:

Numerals
Central Solomon numerals from Pedrós (2015):

{| 
! numeral !! Savosavo !! Touo !! Lavukaleve !! Bilua
|-
! 1
| ˈela, ˈpade / pa || aɺo / azo || ˈtelakom, ˈtelako || ˈomadeu, ˈmadeu
|-
! 2
| ˈedo || e̤ɺi || ˈlelemal, ˈlelaol, ˈlelaɰel, ˈlemal || ˈomuga, ˈmuga
|-
! 3
| iˈɰiβa / iˈɰia || hie || ˈeŋa || ˈzouke, ke
|-
! 4
| ˈaɰaβa || a̤vo || nun || ˈariku
|-
! 5
| ˈara || sodu || ˈsie || ˈsike, ke
|}

As the comparisons indicate, lexical evidence for the relatedness of the four languages is limited.

Vocabulary comparison
The following basic vocabulary words are from Tryon & Hackman (1982), as cited in the Trans-New Guinea database. The Savosavo data is from Claudia Wegener's field notes.

{| class="wikitable sortable"
! gloss !! Lavukaleve !! Mbaniata (Lokuru dialect) !! Mbilua (Ndovele dialect) !! Savosavo
|-
! head
| vatu || uɔ || lezu || batu
|-
! hair
| memea || zufu || tou || luta; sivuɰa
|-
! ear
| hovul || ōŋgoto || taliŋa || tagalu
|-
! eye
| lemi || mberɔ || vilu || nito
|-
! nose
| sisi || emɔ || ŋgame || ɲoko
|-
! tooth
| neo || nāne || taka || nale
|-
! tongue
| let || ānl || leño || lapi
|-
! leg
| tau furime || ɔe || kiti || 
|-
! louse
| kea; lai || lisa; vutu || sipi; tiŋgau || dole
|-
! dog
| mitakeu || sie || siele || misu
|-
! bird
| malaɣul || mānozo || mbiaŋambiaŋa || kosu
|-
! egg
| keruv || āndena || tɔruru || kolei; si
|-
! blood
| ravu || vo || ndara || ɰabu
|-
! bone
| sosokio || minu || piza || tovolo
|-
! skin
| keut || zuɔna || tupu || korakora
|-
! breast
| ɔfu || susu || susu || susu
|-
! man
| ali || finɔzɔ || mamba || tada
|-
! woman
| aira || ŋgohe || reko || adaki
|-
! sky
| totoās || uzia || au || oka
|-
! moon
| kua || īndi || kamboso || kuɰe
|-
! water
| lafi || fiɔ || nĵu || piva
|-
! fire
| lake || hirɔ || uza || keda
|-
! stone
| mbeko; veko || hɛŋga || lando || kato
|-
! road, path
| lake || e || keve || keva
|-
! name
| laŋi || nini || ŋi || nini
|-
! eat
| eu; eui; oune || azafe || vuato || l-ou; samu
|-
! one
| dom; tetelom || āroŋo; thufi || mandeu || ela; pade
|-
! two
| lelal; lemal || ēri || omuŋga || edo
|}

Syntax
All Central Solomon languages have SOV word order except for Bilua, which has SVO word order due to Oceanic influence.

See also
Papuan languages
Temotu languages, Oceanic but with heavy Papuan substrate influence
Reefs-Santa Cruz languages

Further reading
Simon J Greenhill, & Robert Forkel. (2019). lexibank/tryonsolomon: Solomon Islands Languages (Version v3.0) [Data set]. Zenodo.

References

Ross, Malcolm, 2001. "Is there an East Papuan phylum? Evidence from pronouns", in The boy from Bundaberg. Studies in Melanesian linguistics in honour of Tom Dutton, ed. by Andrew Pawley, Malcolm Ross and Darrell Tryon: 301-322. Canberra: Pacific Linguistics.
Structural Phylogenetics and the Reconstruction of Ancient Language History. Michael Dunn, Angela Terrill, Ger Reesink, Robert A. Foley, Stephen C. Levinson. Science magazine, 23 Sept. 2005, vol. 309, p 2072.
Ross, Malcolm, 2005. "Pronouns as a preliminary diagnostic for grouping Papuan languages", in Papuan pasts: cultural, linguistic and biological histories of Papuan speaking peoples, ed. by Andrew Pawley, Robert Attenborough, Robin Hide and Jack Golson: 15-65. Canberra: Pacific Linguistics.
Pedrós, Toni, 2015. "New arguments for a Central Solomons family based on evidence from pronominal morphemes". Oceanic Linguistics, vol. 54, no. 2 (358-395).

External links
Central Solomons languages database at TransNewGuinea.org
Central Solomons word lists (Austronesian Basic Vocabulary Database)

 
East Papuan languages
Languages of the Solomon Islands
Language families